The 2011 TC 2000 Championship is the 33rd Turismo Competicion 2000 season.

Teams and drivers

Race calendar and results

Championship standings
Points were awarded as follows:

Notes

References

External links
Official site 

TC 2000 Championship seasons
TC 2000 season
TC 2000 season